This is a list of shopping centres in the United Kingdom. This list does not include retail parks.

England
The list is split by region.

London

 Angel Central, Angel
 Aylesham Centre, Peckham
 The Bentall Centre, Kingston upon Thames
 Blenheim Centre, Hounslow
 Blenheim Shopping Centre, Penge
 Brent Cross, Hendon
 The Brewery, Romford
 The Broadwalk Centre, Edgware
 Broadway Shopping Centre, Bexleyheath
 The Brunswick, Bloomsbury
 Burlington Arcade, Piccadilly, London
 Butterfly Walk, Camberwell
 Canary Wharf Shopping Centre, Canary Wharf
 Centrale, Croydon
 Centre Court Shopping Centre, Wimbledon
 The Chimes, Uxbridge
 Cloisters Mall, Kingston upon Thames
 Ealing Broadway Centre, Ealing
 Eden Walk, Kingston upon Thames
 Edmonton Green Shopping Centre, Edmonton
 Elephant and Castle Shopping Centre, Elephant & Castle
 Exchange Ilford, Ilford
 Putney Exchange, Putney
 The Glades, Bromley
 Hay's Galleria, London
 Heathway Shopping Centre, Dagenham
 Kensington Arcade, Kensington High Street
 Kingsland Shopping Centre, Dalston
 Kings Mall, Hammersmith 
 Kings Walk, Kings Road, London
 Lewisham Shopping Centre, Lewisham
 The Liberty, Romford
 London Designer Outlet, Wembley Park
 The Mall, Bromley
 The Mall Walthamstow, Walthamstow
 The Mall Wood Green, Wood Green
 The Mercury Mall, Romford
 O2 Centre, Finchley Road, London
 One New Change, Cheapside, City of London
 Oriental City, Colindale
 The Pavilions, Uxbridge
 Palace Exchange, Enfield Town
 Palace Gardens, Enfield Town
 Piccadilly Arcade, Piccadilly / Jermyn Street, London
 Princes Arcade, Piccadilly / Jermyn Street, London
 Southside Wandsworth
 The Spires Shopping Centre, Barnet
 St Anns, Harrow
 St George's, Harrow
 St Nicholas Centre, Sutton
 Stratford Centre, Stratford
 Surrey Quays Shopping Centre, Rotherhithe
 Times Square, Sutton
 Treaty Centre, Hounslow
 Trocadero, Shaftesbury Avenue, London
 Victoria Place Shopping Centre, Buckingham Palace Road, London
 Walnuts Shopping Centre, Orpington
 West 12 Shepherds Bush
 West One Shopping Centre, Oxford Street, London
 Westfield London, White City
 Westfield Stratford City, Stratford
 Whiteleys, Bayswater
 Whitgift Centre, Croydon
 Vicarage Field, Barking

East of England
 Anglia Square, Norwich
Arc, Bury St. Edmunds
Grand Arcade, Cambridge
 atria Watford, Watford (formerly The Harlequin and intu Watford)
 Bond Street, Chelmsford
The Britten Centre, Lowestoft
 The Buttermarket, Ipswich
 Castle Quarter, Norwich
 Chantry Place, Norwich
 Culver Square, Colchester
 Dalegate Market / Shopping & Cafe, Burnham Deepdale, North Norfolk Coast
 Eastgate Shopping Centre, Basildon
 The Forum, Stevenage
 Garden Square Shopping Centre, Letchworth
 George Yard Shopping Centre, Braintree
 Grafton Centre, Cambridge
 The Harvey Centre, Harlow
 High Chelmer Shopping Centre, Chelmsford
 Howard Centre, Welwyn Garden City
 Jackson Square Shopping Centre, Bishop's Stortford
 Knightswick Shopping Centre, Canvey Island
 Lakeside Shopping Centre, West Thurrock
 Lion Walk, Colchester
 Lion Yard, Cambridge
 The Mall, Luton (formerly The Mall Arndale)
 Market Gates Shopping Centre, Great Yarmouth
 The Marlowes Shopping Centre, Hemel Hempstead
 Meadows Shopping Centre, Chelmsford
 Pavilions Shopping Centre, Waltham Cross
 Quadrant Shopping Centre, Dunstable
 Queensgate Shopping Centre, Peterborough
 Queensgate Shopping Centre, Harlow
 Royal Arcade, Norwich
 The Royals, Southend-on-Sea
 Sailmakers Shopping Centre, Ipswich
Serpentine Green, Peterborough
 Vancouver Quarter, King's Lynn
 Victoria Arcade, Great Yarmouth
 The Victoria, Southend-on-Sea

East Midlands
  Beaumont Shopping Centre ,  Beaumont Leys 
 Broadmarsh, Nottingham
 Cavendish Arcade, Buxton
 East Midlands Designer Outlet, South Normanton
 West End Arcade, Nottingham 
 Exchange Arcade, Nottingham
 Flying Horse Walk, Nottingham
  Fosse Park, Enderby
 Giltbrook Shopping Park, Giltbrook, Nottingham
 Castle Marina Shopping Park, Nottingham
 Derbion (formerly Intu Derby, formerly Westfield Derby, formerly Eagle Centre)
 The Forge Shopping Centre, Dronfield
 Four Seasons Shopping Centre, Mansfield
 Grosvenor Centre, Northampton
 Haymarket Shopping Centre, Leicester
 St Martins Square, Leicester
 Highcross Leicester
 Idlewells Shopping Centre, Sutton-in-Ashfield
 Masson Mills Shopping Village, Matlock Bath
 Park Farm Shopping Centre, Allestree
 The Pavements, Chesterfield
 Peak Village, Rowsley
 Rushden Lakes, Rushden
 Silver Arcade, Leicester
 Spring Gardens, Buxton
 St Marks Shopping Centre, Lincoln
 Swansgate Shopping Centre, Wellingborough (formerly Arndale Centre)
 Newlands Shopping Centre, Kettering
 Thurmaston Shopping Centre, Thurmaston
 Vicar Lane, Chesterfield
 Victoria Centre, Nottingham
 Waterside Centre, Lincoln

North East
 The Bridges, Sunderland
 Central Arcade, Newcastle upon Tyne
 Cleveland Centre, Middlesbrough
 Cornmill Shopping Centre, Darlington
 Dalton Park, Murton, County Durham
 Eldon Garden, Newcastle upon Tyne
 Eldon Square Shopping Centre, Newcastle upon Tyne
 Galleries, Washington
 Hill Street Shopping Centre, Middlesbrough
 Manor Walks Shopping Centre, Cramlington
 MetroCentre, Gateshead (Largest shopping mall in Europe)
 Middleton Grange Shopping Centre, Hartlepool
 Milburn Gate Shopping Centre (The Gates Shopping Centre), Durham -
 Monument Mall Shopping Centre, Newcastle upon Tyne
 Newgate Shopping Centre, Newcastle upon Tyne
 Queen Street Arcade, Darlington
 Royal Quays, North Shields
 Wellington Square, South Shields
 Wellington Square, Stockton on Tees

- The Gates Shopping Centre is undergoing renovation. The centre will reopen as The Riverwalk in Summer 2018.

North West
 Accrington Arndale, Accrington
 Affinity Lancashire, Fleetwood, Lancashire
 Arndale Centre, Morecambe
 Ashton Arcades, Ashton-under-Lyne
 Birchwood Shopping Centre, Birchwood, Warrington
 Charter Walk Shopping Centre, Burnley
 Cherry Tree Shopping Centre, Wallasey
 Cheshire Oaks Designer Outlet, Ellesmere Port
 Clarendon Square Shopping Centre, Hyde
 Clayton Square, Liverpool
 Cockhedge Shopping Centre, Warrington
 Crompton Place Shopping Centre, Bolton (formerly Arndale Centre)
 Fishergate Shopping Centre, Preston
 The Galleries, Wigan
 Golden Square Shopping Centre, Warrington
 Grand Arcade, Wigan
 Green Oaks, Widnes
 Houndshill Shopping Centre, Blackpool
 The Lanes Shopping Centre, Carlisle
 Liverpool One, Liverpool
 Lowry Outlet Mall, Salford Quays (formerly Lowry Designer Outlet / Designer Outlet at The Lowry)
 The Mall Blackburn, Blackburn (formerly Blackburn Shopping Centre)
 The Mall Chester, Chester (formerly The Mall Grosvenor / Grosvenor Shopping Centre)
 Manchester Arndale, Manchester
 Marble Place Shopping Centre, Southport
 Marketgate Shopping Centre, Lancaster
 The Market Shopping Centre, Crewe
 Market Walk Shopping Centre, Chorley
 Merseyway Shopping Centre, Stockport
 Metquarter, Liverpool
 Middlebrook, Horwich/Lostock, Bolton
 Middleton Shopping Centre, Middleton (formerly Arndale Centre)
 Miller Arcade, Preston
 The Millgate Shopping Centre, Bury
 New Strand Shopping Centre, Bootle
 Pendle Rise Shopping Centre, Nelson (formerly Admiral Shopping Centre / Arndale Centre)
 Port Arcades, Ellesmere Port
 Portland Walk Shopping Centre, Barrow-in-Furness
 Prescot Shopping Centre, Merseyside
The Rock, Bury
 Runcorn Shopping City, Runcorn
 Salford Shopping Centre, Salford
 Spindles Town Square Shopping Centre, Oldham
 Spinning Gate Shopping Centre, Leigh, Greater Manchester
 St George's Shopping Centre, Preston (formerly The Mall Preston, The Mall St. George)
 St. John's Shopping Centre, Liverpool
 St. Nicholas Arcades Shopping Centre, Lancaster
 Stretford Mall, Stretford (formerly Arndale Centre)
 Swan Court Shopping Arcade, Clitheroe
 Trafford Centre, Trafford
 Triangle Shopping Centre, Manchester
 Washington Square, Workington
 Wayfarers Shopping Arcade, Southport (formerly Burton Arcade / Leyland Arcade)
 Westmorland Shopping Centre, Kendal

South East
 Angel Centre, Tonbridge
 The Arcade, Littlehampton
 Arndale Centre, Eastbourne
 Ashford Designer Outlet, Ashford
 The Ashley Centre, Epsom
 Bargate Centre, Southampton
 Bay Tree Walk, Wickham, Hampshire
 The Belfry, Redhill
 Bicester Village Shopping Centre, Bicester
 Bluewater, Greenhithe
 Bracknell Shopping Centre, Bracknell
 Broad Street Mall, Reading
 The Brooks, Winchester
 Brunel Centre, Bletchley
 Cascades Shopping Centre, Portsmouth
 Castle Quay Shopping Centre, Banbury
 Central Milton Keynes Shopping Centre, Milton Keynes
 Chantry Centre, Andover
 Charlton Shopping Centre, Dover
 East Street Shopping Centre, Southampton
 Chilterns Shopping Centre, High Wycombe
 Churchill Square, Brighton
 Clarendon Shopping Centre, Oxford
 County Mall, Crawley
 County Square, Ashford
 Eden Shopping, Buckinghamshire
 Elmsleigh Centre, Staines
 Fareham Shopping Centre, Fareham
 Festival Place, Basingstoke
 The Forum, Sittingbourne
 Fremlin Walk, Maidstone
 Friars Square, Aylesbury
 Friars Walk, Reading
 The Friary Centre, Guildford (formerly Westfield Friary Shopping Centre)
 The Furlong, Ringwood
 Golden Cross, Oxford
 Guildbourne Centre, Worthing
 Gunwharf Quays, Portsmouth
 Hale Leys Shopping Centre, Aylesbury
 Hart Centre, Fleet
 Holmbush Centre, Shoreham-by-Sea
 Kennet Shopping, Newbury (formerly The Kennet Centre)
 King Edward Court, Windsor
 Kingsmead, Farnborough
 The Mall Camberley, Camberley (formerly The Mall Main Square / Main Square)
 The Mall Maidstone, Maidstone (formerly The Mall Chequers / Chequers Centre / The Stoneborough Centre)
 The Mall Southampton, Southampton (formerly The Mall Marlands / Marlands Shopping Centre)
 The Malls, Basingstoke
 Market Place, Burgess Hill.
 The Martlets, Burgess Hill.
 Meridian Shopping, Havant (formerly Meridian Centre)
 Montague Centre, Worthing
 Nicholsons Shopping Centre, Maidenhead
 Octagon Shopping Centre, High Wycombe
 The Oracle, Reading
 Orchards Shopping Centre, Dartford
 Orchards Shopping Centre, Haywards Heath
 The Pavilion Shopping Centre, Tonbridge
 The Peacocks, Woking
 The Pentagon Shopping Centre, Chatham
 Princes Mead Shopping Centre, Farnborough
 Priory Meadow Shopping Centre, Hastings
 Queensmere Observatory, Slough (formerly Queensmere Shopping Centre and Observatory Shopping Centre)
 Royal Arcade, Worthing
 Royal Victoria Place, Tunbridge Wells (formerly Westfield Royal Victoria Place)
 Sovereign Centre, Boscombe
 Spread Eagle Walk Shopping Centre, Epsom
 St. Martin's Walk Shopping Centre, Dorking
 Swan Shopping Centre Eastleigh, Eastleigh
 Swan Walk, Horsham
 Templars Square shopping centre, Cowley, Oxford
 Tunsgate Square, Guildford
 Warwick Lane, Wickham, Hampshire
 Wellington Centre, Aldershot
 Westquay, Southampton
 Westgate Shopping Centre, Oxford
 Westwood Cross, Broadstairs
 White Lion Walk, Guildford
 Whitefriars Shopping Centre, Canterbury
 Windsor Royal Shopping, Windsor
 Wolsey Place, Woking
 Woolgate Shopping Centre, Witney

South West
 The Arcade, Bournemouth
 Angel Place Shopping Centre, Bridgwater
 Armada Centre, Plymouth
 Atlantic Village, Bideford
 Avenue Shopping Centre, Bournemouth
 Beechwood Shopping Centre, Cheltenham
 Borough Parade Shopping Centre, Chippenham
 Broadwalk, Bristol
 Brunel Centre, Swindon
 Cabot Circus, Bristol
 Castlemead Shopping Centre, Worle
 Castle Place Shopping Centre, Trowbridge
 Castlepoint, Bournemouth
 Clarks Village, Street
 Cross Keys Shopping Centre, Salisbury
 Crossways Centre, Paignton 
 Dolphin Shopping Centre, Poole (formerly Arndale Centre)
 Drake Circus, Plymouth

 Eastgate Shopping Centre, Gloucester (formerly The Mall, Gloucester, The Mall Eastgate / Eastgate Centre)
 Emery Gate Shopping Centre, Chippenham
 Fleet Walk, Torquay
 The Galleries, Bristol
 Green Lanes Shopping Centre, Barnstaple
 Guildhall Shopping Centre, Exeter
 Kings Walk Shopping Centre, Gloucester
 Labels Outlet Shopping, Ross-on-Wye
 The Mall at Cribbs Causeway, Bristol
 Merrywalks, Stroud
 Orchard Shopping Centre, Taunton
 Princesshay, Exeter
 Quadrant Shopping Centre, Bournemouth
 Queensway Centre, Worle

 Regent Arcade Shopping Centre, Cheltenham
 The Shires Shopping Centre, Trowbridge
 Sovereign Shopping Centre, Weston-super-Mare
 SouthGate, Bath
 Swindon Designer Outlet, Swindon
 Tudor Arcade, Dorchester
 Union Square, Torquay (formerly Haldon Centre)
 Victoria Square, Paignton
 Weaver's Walk, Bradford-on-Avon
 West Swindon Shopping Centre, Swindon
 The Westway Shopping Centre, Frome
 Wharfside Shopping Centre, Penzance

 Yate Shopping Centre, Yate
  Market Walk, Newton Abbot

West Midlands
 Ankerside Shopping Centre, Tamworth
 Arena Park Shopping Centre, Coventry
 Bull Ring, Birmingham
 Cathedral Lanes Shopping Centre, Coventry
 Cathedral Plaza Shopping Centre, Worcester
 Chelmsley Wood Shopping Centre, Chelmsley Wood, Birmingham
 City Plaza, Birmingham
 Clock Towers Shopping Centre, Rugby
 Coopers Square, Burton-upon-Trent
 The Cornbow Centre, Halesowen
 CrownGate Shopping Centre, Worcester
 Darwin Shopping Centre, Shrewsbury
 The Fort Shopping Park, Birmingham
 Grand Central, Birmingham
 Guildhall Shopping Centre, Stafford
 Kingfisher Shopping Centre, Redditch
 
 
 Lower Precinct, Coventry
 The Mailbox, Birmingham
 The Mall Sutton Coldfield, Sutton Coldfield
 Mander Centre, Wolverhampton
 Martineau Place, Birmingham
 Maybird Centre, Stratford-upon-Avon
 Maylord Shopping Centre, Hereford
 Mell Square, Solihull
 Westfield Merry Hill, Brierley Hill
 New Hall Walk, Sutton Coldfield
 Northfield Shopping Centre, Birmingham
 Octagon Shopping Centre, Burton upon Trent
 Old Market, Hereford
 One Stop Shopping Centre, Perry Barr, Birmingham
 The Potteries, Hanley, Stoke-on-Trent
 Pride Hill Shopping Centre, Shrewsbury
 Red Rose Centre, Sutton Coldfield
 Ropewalk Shopping Centre, Nuneaton
 Royal Priors, Leamington Spa
 The Ryemarket, Stourbridge
 The Saddler Centre, Walsall
 Telford Shopping Centre, Telford
 Three Spires Shopping Centre, Lichfield
 Touchwood, Solihull
 Victorian Arcade, Walsall
 West Orchards Shopping Centre, Coventry
 Wulfrun Centre, Wolverhampton

Yorkshire and the Humber
 Airedale Shopping Centre, Keighley
 Alhambra Shopping Centre, Barnsley (previously called The Mall Alhambra and The Mall Barnsley)
 Brunswick Shopping Centre, Scarborough
 Carlton Lanes Shopping Centre, Castleford
 Coppergate Shopping Centre, York
 Corn Exchange, Leeds
 Crossgates Shopping Centre, Cross Gates (formerly Arndale Centre)
 Crystal Peaks, Sheffield
 Victoria Gate, Leeds
 Frenchgate Centre, Doncaster (formerly Arndale Centre)
Flemingate, Beverley
 Freshney Place, Grimsby (formerly Riverhead Centre)
 The Core, Leeds (formerly The Schofields Centre, then The Headrow Centre)
 Hillsborough Shopping Exchange, Sheffield
 Holt Park District Centre, Holt Park, Leeds
 Horsefair Centre, Wetherby
 Kingsgate Shopping Centre, Huddersfield
 Kirkgate Centre, Bradford

 The Light, Leeds
 Meadowhall, Sheffield
 Merrion Centre, Leeds
 The Metropolitan Centre, Barnsley
 North Point Shopping Centre, Hull
 Orchard Square, Sheffield
 The Parishes, Scunthorpe
 Penny Hill Centre, Hunslet, Leeds
 Piazza Centre, Huddersfield
 Princes Quay, Kingston upon Hull
 The Prospect Centre, Kingston upon Hull
 Rawson Quarter, Bradford
 The Ridings Centre, Wakefield
 St. John's Centre, Leeds
 St. Stephen's Hull, Kingston upon Hull
 Trinity Leeds, Leeds (formerly Bond Street Centre, then Leeds Shopping Plaza)
 Trinity Walk, Wakefield
 Victoria Gardens Shopping Centre, Harrogate
 Victoria Quarter, Leeds
 The Broadway, Bradford
 White Rose Centre, Leeds
 York Designer Outlet, York

Northern Ireland
 Abbey Centre, Newtownabbey
 Ards Shopping Centre, Newtownards
 Bloomfield Centre, Bangor
 Bow Street Mall, Lisburn
 Buttercrane Shopping Centre, Newry
 Carryduff Shopping Centre, Carryduff
 CastleCourt, Belfast
 Connswater Shopping Centre, Belfast
 Diamond Shopping Centre, Coleraine
 Erneside Shopping Centre, Enniskillen
 Fairhill Centre, Ballymena
 Flagship Shopping Centre, Bangor (closed 2019)
 Forestside Shopping Centre, Belfast
 Foyleside Shopping Centre, Derry
 The Gallery, Belfast (proposed)
 Holywood Exchange, Holywood
 Kennedy Centre, Belfast
 Main Street Mall, Omagh
 Oaks Shopping Centre, Dungannon
 The Park Centre, Belfast
 The Quays, Newry
 Richmond Centre, Derry
 Royal Exchange, Belfast (proposed)
 Rushmere Shopping Centre, Craigavon
 Sprucefield, Lisburn
 Tower Centre, Ballymena
 Victoria Square, Belfast
 Westwood Centre, Belfast

Scotland
Aberdeen City
 Aberdeen Market, Aberdeen (closed 2020)
 The Academy Shopping Centre, Aberdeen
 Bon Accord Centre, Aberdeen  (including the former St. Nicholas Shopping Centre)
 Trinity Centre, Aberdeen
 Union Square, Aberdeen

Angus
 Abbeygate Shopping Centre, Arbroath

City of Edinburgh
 Cameron Toll Shopping Centre, Edinburgh
 The Gyle Shopping Centre, Edinburgh
 Ocean Terminal, Leith
 Waverley Market, Edinburgh
 St James Quarter (formerly St James Centre)
 Westside Plaza, Edinburgh

Clackmannanshire
 Sterling Mills, Tillicoultry

Dundee City
 City Quay, Dundee
 Keiller Shopping Centre, Dundee
 Overgate Centre, Dundee
 Wellgate Centre, Dundee
Dumfries & Galloway

 Gretna Green Famous Blacksmiths Shop Attractions, Gretna Green, Gretna

East Ayrshire
 Burns Mall, Kilmarnock

Falkirk
 Callendar Square Shopping Centre, Falkirk
 The Mall Falkirk, Falkirk → (formerly The Mall Howgate, Howgate Centre)

Fife
 Kingdom Shopping Centre, Glenrothes
 Kingsgate Centre, Dunfermline
 The Mercat Shopping Centre, Kirkcaldy
 The Postings, Kirkcaldy

Glasgow City
 Buchanan Galleries, Glasgow
 The Forge Shopping Centre, Glasgow
 Glasgow Fort, Glasgow
 Italian Centre, Glasgow
 Princes Square, Glasgow
 Sauchiehall Centre, Glasgow (formerly Sauchiehall Street Centre)
 Silverburn Mall, Glasgow
 St. Enoch Centre, Glasgow

Highland
 Eastgate Shopping Centre, Inverness

Inverclyde
 Oak Mall Shopping Centre, Greenock

Orkney Islands
 Anchor Shopping Centre
Kirkwall, Orkney

Midlothian
 Straiton Park, Loanhead

Moray
 St. Giles Centre, Elgin

North Ayrshire
 Rivergate Centre, Irvine

North Lanarkshire
 Antonine Centre, Cumbernauld
 Cumbernauld Town Centre, Cumbernauld
 Motherwell Shopping Centre, Motherwell

Perth and Kinross
 St. John's Centre, Perth

Renfrewshire
 Braehead Shopping Centre, Renfrew
 Paisley Centre, Paisley
 The Piazza, Paisley

Shetland Islands
 Toll Clock Shopping Centre, Lerwick, Shetland

South Ayrshire
 Ayr Central, Ayr
 Kyle Centre, Ayr

South Lanarkshire
 East Kilbride Shopping Centre, East Kilbride
 New Cross Shopping Centre, Hamilton
 Regent Shopping Centre, Hamilton

Stirling
 Thistles Centre, Stirling

West Dunbartonshire
 Clyde Shopping Centre, Clydebank

West Lothian
 Almondvale Centre, Livingston
 The Centre, Livingston, West Lothian

Wales

South
 Aberafan Centre, Port Talbot
 Bridgend Designer Outlet, Bridgend
 Cambrian Centre, Newport
 Cwmbran Centre, Cwmbran
 Daniel Owen Shopping Centre, Neath
 Festival Park, Ebbw Vale
 Friars Walk, Newport
 Kingsway Shopping Centre, Newport
 Merlins Walk, Carmarthen
 Quadrant Shopping Centre, Swansea
 Queens Arcade, Cardiff
 St. David's Centre, Cardiff
 St. Elli Shopping Centre, Llanelli
 St. Tydfil Shopping Centre, Merthyr Tydfil

North
 Border Retail Park, Wrexham
 Central Retail Park, Wrexham
 Deniol Centre, Bangor
 Eagles Meadow, Wrexham - largest in North Wales
 Island Green, Wrexham - note: has its own railway station
 Menai Centre, Bangor
 Parc Llandudno, Llandudno
 Plas Coch, Wrexham
 Victoria Centre, Llandudno

Chains and property investment companies
 Arndale Centres
 British Land
 F&C REIT
 Hammerson
 Intu
 Land Securities
 The Mall Company
 McArthurGlen Designer Outlets
 Peel Group
 The Westfield Group

See also

List of shopping centres in the United Kingdom by size
Comprehensive United Kingdom shopping directory

References 

United Kingdom
Shopping centres in the United Kingdom
Shopping malls